Massimo Quiriconi (born 8 January 1963) is a former Italian race walker.

Biography
He competed for his native country at the 1992 Summer Olympics, finishing in 13th place in the men's 50 km walk event. Pezzatini set his personal best (3:55.14) in the men's 50 km walk event in 1993.

Progression
50 km walk

Achievements

See also
 Italian team at the running events
 Italy at the IAAF World Race Walking Cup

References

External links
 

1963 births
Living people
Italian male racewalkers
Athletes (track and field) at the 1992 Summer Olympics
Olympic athletes of Italy
World Athletics Championships athletes for Italy
Athletics competitors of Fiamme Gialle
20th-century Italian people